The Yellow Dog is a 1918 American silent drama film directed by Colin Campbell and starring Arthur Hoyt, Antrim Short, and Clara Horton.

Cast

References

Bibliography
 Donald W. McCaffrey & Christopher P. Jacobs. Guide to the Silent Years of American Cinema. Greenwood Publishing, 1999.

External links
 

1918 films
1918 drama films
1910s English-language films
American silent feature films
Silent American drama films
Films directed by Colin Campbell
American black-and-white films
Universal Pictures films
1910s American films